E-collection is the fourth compilation album released by Brazilian rock band Titãs. It is a double album. The first CD features greatest hits of the group, and the second one, only rarities.

Track listing

Disc one 

"Pela Paz" was only released in the re-issue of Domingo. For that reason, it was not considered part of the rarities disc, and therefore it was featured on the hits disc.

Disc two

References

2000 compilation albums
Titãs compilation albums
Warner Music Group compilation albums